The 1987–88 Gonzaga Bulldogs men's basketball team represented Gonzaga University in the West Coast Athletic Conference (WCAC) during the 1987–88 NCAA Division I men's basketball season. Led by sixth-year head coach Dan Fitzgerald, the Bulldogs were  overall in the regular season  and played their home games on campus at the Charlotte Y. Martin Centre (formerly known as Kennedy Pavilion) in Spokane, Washington.

Their first tournament wins came four years later in 1992; they advanced to the final, but fell by three to the top-seeded Waves.

Postseason results

|-
!colspan=6 style=| WCAC tournament

References

External links
Sports Reference – Gonzaga Bulldogs men's basketball – 1987–88 season

Gonzaga Bulldogs men's basketball seasons
Gonzaga
1987 in sports in Washington (state)
1988 in sports in Washington (state)